Trouble with Jolanthe (German: Krach um Jolanthe) is a 1934 German romantic comedy film directed by Carl Froelich and starring Wilhelm P. Krüger, Marianne Hoppe and Olaf Bach. It was remade in 1955 as The Happy Village. A separate Swedish adaptation Jolanta the Elusive Pig had been released in 1945.

The film's sets were designed by the art director Franz Schroedter.

Cast

See also
Jolanta the Elusive Pig (1945)

References

External links

Films of Nazi Germany
German romantic comedy films
1934 romantic comedy films
Films directed by Carl Froelich
German films based on plays
German black-and-white films
1930s German films